The Lafarge Case (French: L'Affaire Lafarge) is a 1938 French historical crime film directed by Pierre Chenal and starring Pierre Renoir, Marcelle Chantal and Raymond Rouleau. It recalls a famous nineteenth century case, and is mostly portrayed in flashback.

The film's sets were designed by the art directors Robert Gys and Eugène Lourié.

Cast

References

Bibliography
 Andrews, Dudley. Mists of Regret: Culture and Sensibility in Classic French Film. Princeton University Press, 1995.

External links
 

1938 films
1930s French-language films
French crime drama films
Films directed by Pierre Chenal
1938 crime drama films
French historical films
1930s historical films
Films set in the 19th century
French black-and-white films
1930s French films